Chamhatti (urdu, چمہٹی) is a village located in newly created Tehsil Lower Tanawal (urdu, لوئر تناول) and is the part of Union Council  Sherwan of Abbottabad District in Khyber Pakhtunkhwa province of Pakistan.[1] It was an independent union council until 2002 but later on it was merged with Union Council Sherwan. Tanoli is the notable tribe of Chamhatti village and surrounding  areas along with some other tribes like Awan, Syed and Gujjer etc. Its neighbouring villages are: 
Juhna, 
Dera Sharif, 
Nakka, 
Khalabat, 
Kangar Bala, 
Kangar Pain, 
Ahmad Abad, 
Thathi Ahmad Khan,
Namshehra, 
Kharpir, 
Kameela, 
Nechaan, 
Beri, 
Chakar Bayaan Khurd and
Chakar Bayaan Kalan. 
Chamhatti is located at a distance of about 25 Kilometers from Mansehra City and a distance of about 50 Kilometers from Abbottabad.

Education:
Chamhatti and its every neighbouring village have at least one primary school. There are three middle schools for girls in Chamhatti, Thathi Ahmad Khan and in Kangar Bala. And two middle schools for boys in Thathi Ahmad Khan and in Kangar Pain. There is also a high school for boys in Chamhatti village. Some famous teachers of Government High School  Chamhatti are:

Aslam Khan,
Munawwar Sultan,
Dilbahadur,
Nisar Sulemani,
Muhammad Tariq,
Maqbool ur Rehman,
Jehanzeb Khan,
Qari Sultan,
Abdul Mustafa,
Zulfiqar Ali,
Abdul Majeed, and
Imtiaz Ahmad etc.

Chamhatti is located at an average elevation of 849 metres (2788 feet). It is located in the North West of Abbottabad District where it forms part of the border with Mansehra District.

References

Populated places in Abbottabad District